Presidential elections were held in East Timor for the first time on 14 April 2002 under UN administration. As expected, the former president of the East Timorese resistance movement, Conselho Nacional da Resistencia Timorense, Xanana Gusmão, running as an independent candidate but with the unofficial support of small opposition parties like the Democratic Party, won a large majority.

Gusmão only had one challenger, former FRETILIN president Francisco Xavier do Amaral, who had been sworn in as president when East Timor declared independence on 28 November 1975, though his term was short-lived as Indonesia invaded on 5 December. Do Amaral, now head of a new party, the ASDT, had admitted that he fully expected to lose to Gusmão, but felt that running was symbolically important, demonstrating the strength of East Timor's democracy by ensuring that Gusmão had competition in the race.

Results

References

Presidential elections in East Timor
2002 in East Timor
East Timor